Liam Cunningham is an actor.

Liam Cunningham may also refer to:

Liam Cunningham (politician)
Liam Cunningham (boxer) in 1998 Commonwealth Games
Liam Cunningham (rugby league), rugby league footballer of the 2010s for Doncaster, Hull FC, and York City Knights